HMS Popham was a  for the Royal Navy.

Their names were all chosen from villages ending in -ham. The minesweeper was named after Popham, Hampshire.

Following completion she remained in operational reserve at Hythe on Southampton Water until 1956. She was then land-cradled at Rosneath on the Clyde until 1963, and transferred to the Royal Australian Navy on 9 June 1966. She arrived in Sydney as deck cargo on board the freighter Gladstone Star on 3 September 1967. Although she was due to be converted into a diving tender and renamed Otter (Y.299), she remained in reserve in a cradle at Garden Island, Sydney. She was listed for disposal on 31 December 1975 and sold on 17 February 1976.

References
Blackman, R.V.B. ed. Jane's Fighting Ships (1953)

Ham-class minesweepers
Ships built in England
1955 ships
Cold War minesweepers of the United Kingdom
Royal Navy ship names